Zosimus is a genus of crabs in the family Xanthidae, containing the following species:

 Zosimus actaeoides (A. Milne Edwards, 1867)
 Zosimus aeneus (Linnaeus, 1758)
 Zosimus fissa (Henderson, 1893)
 Zosimus hawaiiensis (Rathbun, 1906)
 Zosimus laevis Dana, 1852
 Zosimus maculatus (Linnaeus, 1758)
 Zosimus sculptus (De Man, 1888)
Three species are known from the fossil record, including two which are extinct.

References

Xanthoidea